Olaya may refer to:

People
 Andrea Olaya (born 1994), Colombian freestyle wrestler
 Eloy Olaya (born 1964), Spanish football forward
 Enrique Olaya Herrera (1880–1937), Colombian journalist and politician, President of Colombia
 José Olaya (1789–1823), Afro-Peruvian hero in the Peruvian War of Independence
 Olaya Pérez Pazo (born 1983), Venezuelan beach volleyball player

Places
 Olaya, Antioquia, a municipality in the department of Antioquia, Colombia
 Olaya (Riyadh), a modern commercial area in northern Riyadh, Saudi Arabia

Other uses
 Olaya (TransMilenio), a bus rapid transit station in Bogotá, Colombia
 Olaya (ship), a tanker ship that served in the Royal Canadian Navy as HMCS Provider and the Peruvian Navy as Organos